Mark Shulman (born April 1, 1962) is an American children's author, born in Rochester, New York, and has written more than 200 books. He is the founder of Oomf, Inc, a book production company.

His debut novel, Scrawl, edited by Neal Porter, is included in the list of Best Fiction for Young Adults by the American Library Association

Mark Shulman lives with his family in New York City.

References

External links
 Mark Shulman's web site
 Oomf, Inc. web site
 Macmillan/Roaring Brook website
 Chronicle Books website
 Author interview
 Author interview

1962 births
Living people
American children's writers
American writers of young adult literature
Children's non-fiction writers
21st-century American novelists
American male novelists
American humorists
American publishers (people)
Jewish American writers
Writers from Rochester, New York
Writers from Buffalo, New York
21st-century American male writers
Novelists from New York (state)
21st-century American Jews